Adams Grove is an unincorporated community in western Southampton County, Virginia, United States, off Route 615. It lies at an elevation of 89 feet (27 m).  Its ZIP code is 23844.

The Norfolk, Franklin and Danville Railway runs through the hamlet.

References

Unincorporated communities in Southampton County, Virginia